Nathalie Lancien (born 7 March 1970) is a French racing cyclist and olympic champion in track cycling.

She was born in Paimpol, and is married to cyclist Frédéric Lancien.

She won a gold medal in the points race at the 1996 Summer Olympics in Atlanta. Nathalie Lancien is married to Frédéric Lancien, a tandem cyclist. In Lannion, the sports center bears his name.

References

External links

1970 births
Living people
French female cyclists
Olympic gold medalists for France
Cyclists at the 1996 Summer Olympics
Olympic cyclists of France
French track cyclists
Olympic medalists in cycling
Sportspeople from Côtes-d'Armor
Medalists at the 1996 Summer Olympics
Cyclists from Brittany